{{DISPLAYTITLE:C13H16ClNO}}
The molecular formula C13H16ClNO (molar mass: 237.72 g/mol, exact mass: 237.0920 u) may refer to:

 Ketamine
 Arketamine, or (R)-(−)-ketamine
 Esketamine, also known as (S)-ketamine or S(+)-ketamine

Molecular formulas